Khaled Al Fadhli (born 15 May 1974) is a Kuwaiti footballer who is a goalkeeper for the Kuwaiti Premier League club Al Kuwait.

References

1974 births
Living people
Kuwaiti footballers
1996 AFC Asian Cup players
Asian Games medalists in football
Footballers at the 1994 Asian Games
Footballers at the 1998 Asian Games
Sportspeople from Kuwait City
Asian Games silver medalists for Kuwait
Asian Games bronze medalists for Kuwait
Association football goalkeepers
Medalists at the 1994 Asian Games
Medalists at the 1998 Asian Games
Kuwait SC players
Kazma SC players
AFC Cup winning players
Kuwait international footballers
Kuwait Premier League players